Obscene Eulogy is a Canadian death/black metal band from Saint John, New Brunswick. The band record with Impaled Nazarene's Mika Luttinen on vocals. Their current singer is Tapio Wilska of Finntroll.

History
Beginning in 2002, singer Mika Luttinen, along with Jamie "Disease" Vautour on guitar and bass and multi-instrumentalist "N.", formed Oscene Eulogy and released three albums of metal music. Their third album. Defining Hate, included guest musicians Killjoy and Wilska van Fintroll.

As well as their own albums, the band appeared on the compilation album Firebox Sampler Vol. 1.

Members

Current members
 Disease (Jamie Vautour) - guitar, bass
 N. - guitar, bass, effects, keyboards
 Tapio Wilska - vocals

Past members
 Mika Luttinen - vocals

Discography
A Portal into Fire (Demo, 2002)
A Portal into Fire (EP, 2003)
Defining Hate: The Truth Undead (Album, 2004)

References

External links
 Fan Site
 Obscene Eulogy at Encyclopaedia Metallum

Canadian death metal musical groups
Musical groups established in 1999
Musical groups from Saint John, New Brunswick
1999 establishments in New Brunswick